Gerdiella is a genus of sea snails, marine gastropod mollusks in the family Cancellariidae, the nutmeg snails.

Species
Species within the genus Gerdiella include:
 Gerdiella alvesi de Lima, de Barros & Petit, 2007
 Gerdiella cingulata (Olsson & Bayer, 1972): synonym of Mericella cingulata (Olsson & Bayer, 1972)
 Gerdiella gerda (Olsson & Bayer, 1972): synonym of Mericella gerda (Olsson & Bayer, 1972)
 Gerdiella santa Olsson & Bayer, 1972 : synonym of  Mericella santa Olsson & Bayer, 1972

References

Cancellariidae